Woods of Arden is an abandoned Staten Island Railway station in the neighborhood of Annadale, Staten Island, New York. The station opened in 1886 with a cost of $112.55. The station closed after 1894. This station was located in between the Annadale and Eltingville stops.

Summer Sundays were spent picnicking, boating, and swimming at Woods of Arden. The resort also included an inn. Erastus Wiman, who helped organize Staten Island Rapid Transit was directly involved with the resort, and had a station built to provide access.

References

External links

Railway stations in the United States opened in 1886
1886 establishments in New York (state)
Defunct Staten Island Railway stations